Gabrieli may refer to:

People
 Andrea Gabrieli (c.1532–1585), composer and organist at San Marco di Venezia
 Giovanni Gabrieli (c.1554–1612), composer and organist at San Marco di Venezia
 Chris Gabrieli (born 1960), American politician
 John Gabrieli, American neuroscientist
 Ugo Gabrieli (born 1989), Italian footballer

Other uses
 Gabrieli (calligrapher) (10th century), Georgian calligrapher
 Gabrieli Quartet, a British string ensemble

See also
 Gabrielli, a surname

Surnames from given names